The 2023–24 CAF Confederation Cup (officially the 2023–24 TotalEnergies CAF Confederation Cup for sponsorship reasons) will be the 21st edition  of Africa's secondary club football tournament organized by the Confederation of African Football (CAF), under the current CAF Confederation Cup title after the merger of CAF Cup and African Cup Winners' Cup.

The winners will automatically qualify for the 2024–25 CAF Confederation Cup, and also earn the right to play against the winners of the 2023-24 CAF Champions League in the 2024 CAF Super Cup.

while there is no official news yet, some media pointed out that the format of the competition will change starting the 2023-24 season so the CAF can use the competition to promote three teams to its newest competition, the Africa Super League.

Association team allocation
All 56 CAF member associations may enter the CAF Confederation Cup, with the 12 highest ranked associations according to their CAF 5-Year Ranking eligible to enter two teams in the competition. As a result, theoretically a maximum of 68 teams could enter the tournament (plus 16 teams eliminated from the CAF Champions League which enter the play-off round) – although this level has never been reached.

For the 2023–24 CAF Confederation Cup, the CAF uses the 2018–2023 CAF 5-Year Ranking, which calculates points for each entrant association based on their clubs’ performance over those 5 years in the CAF Champions League and CAF Confederation Cup. The criteria for points are the following:

The points are multiplied by a coefficient according to the year as follows:
2022-23: × 5
2021–22: × 4
2020–21: × 3
2019–20: × 2
2018–19: × 1

Teams

The following 49 teams from 37 associations entered the competition.
Teams in bold received a bye to the second round.
The other teams entered the first round.

Associations are shown according to their 2018–2023 CAF 5-Year Ranking – those with a ranking score have their rank and score (in parentheses) indicated.

Schedule

See also
2023-24 CAF Champions League
2024 CAF Super Cup
2024 CAF Women's Champions League

Notes

References

External links
CAFonline.com

1